The University of Nottingham Malaysia is a private university branch campus of the University of Nottingham. The university is situated in Semenyih, Selangor, Malaysia. The university has been ranked as "excellent" or tier 5 in a scale of tier 1-6 and is classified as a private institution, by the Malaysian Ministry of Higher Education.

The campus is run as a company called The University of Nottingham Malaysia Sdn Bhd (473520-K) with the provost being dual hatted as the CEO. The majority shareholder is Boustead Holdings.

The Malaysia campus was the first campus of a British university in Malaysia and one of the first to open outside Britain thus earning the distinction of the Queen's Awards for Enterprise 2001 and the Queen's Award for Industry (International Trade) 2006.

The University of Nottingham's other overseas campus is located in Ningbo, China.

History 
Following an invitation from the Ministry of education to establish an overseas campus, a partnership between Boustead Holdings Berhad, YTL Corporation Berhad and the University of Nottingham was formally announced in 1998.

This development was the first ever branch campus of a British University established outside of the UK.

The University of Nottingham welcomed its first 89 students in September 2000 in Kuala Lumpur. In 2005, the university relocated to 118 acre campus in Semenyih, in the valley of Broga Hill. In 2006, the campus reopened a Kuala Lumpur branch in Chulan Tower on Jalan Conlay to teach MBA students.

Campus

Semenyih campus 
The Malaysia campus is primarily based on a  plot situated in Semenyih, Selangor.

The Sports Complex on campus houses the recreational facilities such as two tennis courts, two squash courts, two badminton courts, a 25m swimming pool, a small gym and one big multipurpose field for rugby, football, frisbee etc. There is also a martial arts room within the complex. The complex also has a multipurpose hall with two multipurpose courts for basketball, dodgeball, futsal, volleyball and even badminton.

KL Teaching Centre (KLTC) 
Besides the main campus in Semenyih, a city teaching facility is maintained in Chulan Tower in Kuala Lumpur's central business district. Postgraduate programmes, such as applied psychology, business and management, are taught at the KL Teaching Centre.

Academic 
Being a branch campus of the University of Nottingham, students are not necessarily taught with similar course materials and generally do not sit the same exam papers as those in the UK, but are still under the jurisdiction of the Quality Assurance Agency for Higher Education (QAA). Upon completing a degree at the Malaysia campus, students are awarded a University of Nottingham degree certificate at a convocation held locally which is indistinguishable from the certificates awarded at the Nottingham campus. The degrees that are awarded are accredited by international professional bodies such as the Association of MBAs and the UK Engineering Council.

The Engineering Degree courses are accredited by the Board of Engineering Malaysia (BEM) and the Malaysian Qualifications Agency (MQA).

Research 
The university was given a five-star rating in the Malaysia Research Assessment (MyRA) for research excellence in 2020. The only foreign university in Malaysia to be awarded two consecutive MyRAs.

Comprising 280 academic staff, the university's research focuses on future food Malaysia and developing sustainable societies, nanotechnology, inclusion in the workplace, data analytics and artificial intelligence, among others.

Apart from the taught undergraduate and postgraduate programmes, the university conducts projects for research-based postgraduate studies. There are more than 20 research programmes being carried out at the Malaysia Campus.

Biotechnology Research Centre 
The Biotechnology Research Centre is a  research centre specialising in the applied research of biotechnology products, specifically palm oil crop. The building cost RM3.5M, excluding internal fittings and scientific equipment. Inside the main research building there are two labs, one for the teaching of UNMC biotechnology students and the other for research.

The research centre is operated as a joint collaboration with Applied Agricultural Resources Sdn. Bhd (AAR), a start-up company.

Sport 
The University of Nottingham Rugby Club Nottingham Knights were champions at the 2011 Malaysia Association of Private Colleges and Universities (MAPCU) Rugby tournament. The team beat all opposition without conceding a goal.

The Malaysia campus played host to the Nottingham Tricampus games in the summer of 2010 and again in 2019.

The UNM Men Futsal Team participating in Liga Futsal IPT organized by Ministry of Education since 2018.In 2019, they won the championship

The UNM Sports Complex has a swimming pool, gymnasium (cardio & weights), badminton hall, squash court, indoor sports hall, outdoor court, rugby field, football field and also astro turf.

Student life

Accommodation 
The university offers a variety of On-Campus Accommodation with capacity for 2400 students. Newer accommodation consisting of six halls of residence are located in Student Village North (J Halls), while Student Village South (I Halls) consist of five halls of residence completed when the purpose-built campus was first constructed. The accommodation halls were named after Malaysian islands including: Sipadan, Mabul, Lankayan, Rawa, Gemia, Perhentian.

Each residential hall has its own Hall Warderns (staff) and Hall Tutors (postgraduate students) who will be available to care for your safety and welfare. Entrance into your halls are via door access control using your student ID card.

Security is provided by a team of in-house security officers and outsourced security guards. The university also has over 300 CCTV cameras throughout the campus.

Private accommodation is also available directly opposite the main entrance to the campus called UniVillage.

Student Media 
IGNITE Magazine is the official student media in the Malaysia campus. It is an online media platform founded by Ben Hunte and Eiman Mirghani. The magazine is now supported by the university's School of Modern Languages and Culture. The online magazine is open to the existing student population and provides coverage of both on and off campus events.

Mobility programme 
As part of Nottingham's advantage scheme, students may be exchanged to other campuses. In the words of Vincenzo Raimo, director of Nottingham's International Office “Students can continue studying exactly the same modules available at Nottingham in the UK but overseas instead — experience the excitement of Asia but within the familiar academic setting of Nottingham University, ... Transfers are open to anyone getting good grades and whose degree subject is among those taught overseas. Air fares may not be cheap, but the cost of living is — and anyone spending the full year at a branch pays just half the UK tuition fee. "

Besides exchanging to the UK campus or the China campus, students may also take part in Universitas 21 mobility programme in which students may also be exchanged with universities partner to Universitas 21 in Australia, France, Germany, the Netherlands, United States, United Kingdom, Italy, Denmark, Canada, Mexico, Chile, Japan, China, and South Korea.

These exchanges are not guaranteed but subject to agreement by the exchange partners at the time.

Transportation 

Shuttle bus services are offered free as a university incentive to alleviate on-campus parking issues. However, shuttle bus services are by regulations restricted to students and staff of the university. The nearest public bus route is at the nearest town of Semenyih, approximately 3 km from campus.

The university provides free transportation to the nearby Tesco super store and IOI City Mall which located in Putrajaya, special bus service to the Semenyih mosque for Friday prayers, and a shuttle bus service for students living in the student town of Taman Tasik Semenyih or Semenyih Lake park. A pedestrian bridge connects the neighbouring Taman Tasik Semenyih to the North entrance.

Partner Institution

Malaysia
Universiti Tunku Abdul Rahman

Indonesia
Petra Christian University

Australia
University of Queensland
University of New South Wales

Germany
Munich University of Applied Sciences

Netherlands
University of Groningen

United Kingdom
University of Birmingham
University of Glasgow

Japan
Shiga University
Toyo University

South Korea 

 Chung-Ang University
 Yonsei University

Italy 

 Bocconi University

Chile 

 Universidad del Desarrollo

Mexico 

 Monterrey Institute of Technology and Higher Education

Canada 

 Concordia University

France 

 Sciences Po Toulouse

Denmark 

 Aarhus University

United States Of America 

 Texas A&M University

See also 
 List of University of Nottingham people
 University of Nottingham Ningbo, China

References 

Educational institutions established in 2000
2000 establishments in Malaysia
Law schools in Malaysia
Private universities and colleges in Malaysia
Universities and colleges in Selangor
Malaysia, University of Nottingham in
Engineering universities and colleges in Malaysia
Satellite campuses
Malaysia–United Kingdom relations